is a 1968 Japanese jidaigeki Horror film directed by Kazuo Hase and screenplay by Masashige Narusawa. It stars Masakazu Tamura. Curse of the Blood was adapted from the novel Kaidan Kasanegafuchi written by Renzaburō Shibata.

Plot
Source:

Fukaya Shinzaemon is a samurai of Hatamoto, he borrows a large amount of money from Dr. Yasukawa Sōjun. When Yasukawa demands repayment of the debt, Fukaya kills Yasukawa. From the day on, strange things happens to the Fukaya family one after another by Yasukawa's curse.

Cast
 Masakazu Tamura as Shinichirō
 Koeda Kawaguchi
 Yūsuke Kawazu as Shiznō
 Yukie Kagawa as Hana
 Rokkō Toura as Fukaya Shinzaemon
 Hiroko Sakurai as Ohisa
 Genshu Hanayagi as Toyo
 Masumi Harukawa as Okuma
 Nobuo Kaneko as Dr.Yasukawa Sōjun

References

External links
of the Blood at Shochiku
 

1968 films
Films based on horror novels
Films based on Japanese novels
Films about curses
Films about psychic powers
Japanese ghost films
Jidaigeki films
Samurai films
1960s Japanese-language films
Shochiku films
1960s Japanese films